Duane Ferrell (born February 28, 1965) is an American retired professional basketball player. He played 11 seasons in the National Basketball Association (NBA) for the Atlanta Hawks, Indiana Pacers and Golden State Warriors. He played college basketball at Georgia Tech, where he was twice named All-Atlantic Coast Conference (ACC).

Early life and college career
Ferrell attended high school at Calvert Hall College in Towson, Maryland where he was part of the 1982 National Championship team, the number one rated high school team in the country during his junior year. He then attended Georgia Tech from 1984 to 1988.  Ferrell was named the 1985 Atlantic Coast Conference Rookie of the Year and went on to average 18.6 points per game during his senior year at Georgia Tech.

Professional basketball career

Duane Ferrell was never drafted but found his way into the NBA after being signed as a free agent by the Atlanta Hawks in 1988.
Ferrell would go on to play in six seasons with the Hawks in the reserve role. His best season came in 1991–92, where he produced a career high of 12.7 points per game while averaging 24.2 minutes per game with Atlanta. In the 1989–90 season, Ferrell started the year playing 40 games for the Topeka Sizzlers in the Continental Basketball Association, averaging 24.3 points per game and earning CBA Newcomer of the Year honors. His performance earned him a return trip to the Hawks to end the season.

Ferrell became a free agent at the end of the 1993–94 NBA season and was signed by the Indiana Pacers on September 30, 1994.

After three seasons in Indiana, Ferrell and Pacers teammate Erick Dampier were traded to the Golden State Warriors for All-Star veteran Chris Mullin on August 12, 1997. Ferrell finished his NBA career with the Warriors, amassing a total of 11 seasons in the league with five NBA Playoffs runs (three times with the Hawks and twice with the Pacers). In 1999, he was traded back to the Hawks alongside Bimbo Coles in a deal that sent Mookie Blaylock to the Warriors. Ferrell was waived by the Hawks, ending his career.

He also worked as the Player Relations and Programs Manager for the Atlanta Hawks and Washington Wizards. Ferrell is also involved with On Court Player Development, a basketball academy and community organization that seeks to develop grassroots basketball programs.

Ferrell has had the nickname "Paco" since his college playing days.

References

External links
Duane Ferrell NBA stats @ basketball-reference.com
"Where Are They Now?": Duane Ferrell

1965 births
Living people
African-American basketball players
American men's basketball players
Atlanta Hawks players
Basketball players from Baltimore
Calvert Hall College High School alumni
Georgia Tech Yellow Jackets men's basketball players
Golden State Warriors players
Indiana Pacers players
McDonald's High School All-Americans
Parade High School All-Americans (boys' basketball)
Shooting guards
Small forwards
Topeka Sizzlers players
Undrafted National Basketball Association players
21st-century African-American people
20th-century African-American sportspeople